Eric Webster (24 June 1931 – 24 January 2016) was an English association football player and coach.

Career

Playing career
Born in Manchester, Webster began his career with Ardwick Lads Club, before signing for Manchester City, where he made one appearance in the Football League. After leaving Manchester City, Webster played with Ashton United, Hyde United, Macclesfield Town, Nantlle Vale, Pwllheli and Stalybridge Celtic.

Coaching career
After retiring as a player, Webster managed Stalybridge Celtic, Hyde United, Runcorn and Ashton United, before moving to Stockport County to become head groundsman and a coach, eventually becoming full manager between 1982 and 1985.

He died on 24 January 2016.

References

1931 births
2016 deaths
English footballers
English football managers
Manchester City F.C. players
Ashton United F.C. players
Hyde United F.C. players
Macclesfield Town F.C. players
Nantlle Vale F.C. players
Pwllheli F.C. players
Stalybridge Celtic F.C. players
English Football League players
Stalybridge Celtic F.C. managers
Hyde United F.C. managers
Runcorn F.C. Halton managers
Ashton United F.C. managers
Stockport County F.C. non-playing staff
Stockport County F.C. managers
Association football midfielders